Pine River Township may refer to the following places in the United States:

 Pine River Township, Michigan
 Pine River Township, Minnesota

See also

Pine River (disambiguation)

	

Township name disambiguation pages